Jim or Jimmy Hickey may refer to:
 Jim Hickey (1940s pitcher) (1920–1997), pitcher in Major League Baseball
 Jim Hickey (American football) (1920–1997), American football and basketball player, coach, and college athletics administrator
 Jim Hickey (baseball, born 1961) , pitching coach and former minor league baseball pitcher
 Jim Hickey (broadcaster) (born 1949), weather presenter for TVNZ in New Zealand
 Jim Hickey Jr. (born 1940), American Olympic bobsledder
 Jimmy Hickey Jr. (born 1966), member of the Arkansas State Senate

See also
 James Hickey (disambiguation)